The 1905 Auburn Tigers baseball team represented the Auburn Tigers of the Auburn University in the 1905 college baseball season.

Schedule

References

Auburn Tigers
Auburn Tigers baseball seasons
Auburn Tigers
Southern Intercollegiate Athletic Association baseball champion seasons